The Kangaroo Route is a term coined by Qantas, referring to the commercial passenger air routes flown between Australia and the United Kingdom via the Eastern Hemisphere.

The route has been operated since 1934, but found its name in 1944 from the unique mode of travel of the kangaroo, as the route's "hops" were reminiscent of a kangaroo's hops both use to cover long distances. The term is trademarked and traditionally used by Qantas, although it is often used in the media and by airline competitors to describe all Australia to United Kingdom flights.

In addition to Qantas; by 2003, over 20 airlines operated routes connecting Australia and the UK, including: Air New Zealand, British Airways, Cathay Pacific, Emirates, Japan Airlines, Lauda Air, Malaysia Airlines, Thai Airways, United Airlines and Singapore Airlines, with most involving a change of plane. 15 years later, by mid-2018, the number of airlines was significantly lower, and only two airlines still offered through flights, i.e. not requiring passengers to change plane en route, British Airways and Qantas.

Qantas commenced operating non-stop flights from Perth to London with Boeing 787s on 25 March 2018. This ended the era of the continents of Europe and Oceania not being connected by non-stop flights, marking the first time that all of the world's continents, excluding Antarctica, are connected by non-stop flights.

Origins of the name 

Qantas operated the Australian part of the Kangaroo Route for 9 years before coining (and later trademarking) the name.

After starting airmail operations between Brisbane and Singapore in 1934, Qantas began operating passenger flights connecting Brisbane to Singapore in 1935 following successful awarding of the Australian government's tender. 

After disruption to the route due to the emerging hostilities of World War II, the connectivity was famously restored by Qantas with its "Double Sunrise" service connectivity between Perth and Ceylon on the Indian Ocean Route with Catalina flying boats in 1943.  With the addition of the land based Liberator aircraft to the route in 1944, the "Indian Ocean Route" was officially renamed "The Kangaroo Service" by Qantas' Managing Director Hudson Fysh and pilot Bill Crowther; a play on words of the aviation term "hop" (referring to a leg of a route), and the hop of a kangaroo, an Australian icon. 

Along with the newly created Qantas logo of the flying kangaroo, the terms "Kangaroo Service" and "Kangaroo Route" were trademarked by Qantas and became the airline's branded term to describe Qantas' Australia-United Kingdom connectivity.  

A significant milestone in 1947 when Qantas began operating the entire Kangaroo Route independently.  This April 1947 inauguration is referred to as the birth date of the Kangaroo Route by Qantas, even though it had been operating a part of that route for almost a decade.

History

Early years (1935–1947) 
In 1935 Qantas started flying passengers to Singapore in a De Havilland 86 to connect with London-bound Imperial Airways. London to Brisbane service commenced on 13 April 1935. Imperial Airways and Qantas Empire Airways opened the  London to Brisbane route for passengers for a single fare £195. There were no through bookings on the first service because of heavy sector bookings, but there were two through passengers on the next flight that left London on 20 April. The route opened for passengers from Brisbane to London on 17 April; flights were weekly and the journey time was 12 days.

Eastbound passengers from London would first fly from Croydon to Paris, take an overnight train to Brindisi, and fly onward with stops at Athens, Alexandria (overnight), Gaza, Baghdad (overnight), Basra, Kuwait, Bahrain, Sharjah (overnight), Gwadar, Karachi, Jodhpur (overnight), Delhi, Cawnpore, Allahabad, Calcutta (overnight), Akyab, Rangoon, Bangkok (overnight), Alor Star, Singapore (overnight), Batavia, Sourabaya, Rambang (overnight), Koepang, Darwin (overnight), Longreach (overnight), and Charleville. London-Karachi was operated by Imperial Airways, Karachi-Singapore jointly by Imperial and Indian Trans-Continental Airways, and Singapore-Brisbane by Qantas.

BOAC/Qantas landplane flights from Hurn Airport in southern England to Sydney began in May 1945, initially via Learmonth; after an Avro Lancastrian ditched in the Indian Ocean crossing in 1946, the route shifted back to Singapore. The ABC Guide for September 1947 shows six flights a week from Sydney to England: three Lancastrians that took 77 hr 30 min to Heathrow and three flying boats that took 168 hr 55 min to Poole.

Multiple stops (1947–1973)

Qantas first flew the Kangaroo Route on 1 December 1947. A Lockheed Constellation carried 29 passengers and 11 crew from Sydney to London with stops in Darwin, Singapore, Calcutta, Karachi, Cairo, and Tripoli (passengers stayed overnight in Singapore and Cairo). A return fare was £585, equivalent to 130 weeks average pay. In the 1950s some Qantas flights made other stops, including Frankfurt, Zürich, Rome, Belgrade, Athens, Beirut, Tehran, Bombay, and Colombo. In May 1958 the Kangaroo Route had 11 westward flights a week: four Qantas Super Constellations, four BOAC Britannias, and one Air India Super Constellation from Sydney to London, one KLM Super Constellation Sydney to Amsterdam, and one TAI Douglas DC-6B Auckland to Paris. In February 1959 Qantas' fastest Super Constellation took 63 hr 45 min Sydney to Heathrow and BOAC's Britannia took 49 hr 25 min. Jet flights (Qantas with Boeing 707) started in 1959; in April 1960 the fastest trip from Sydney to London was 34 hr 30 min with eight stops.

In the late 1950s, Qantas had a round-the-world network, flying Australia to Europe westward on the Kangaroo Route and eastward on the Southern Cross Route (via the Pacific Ocean). In 1964 Qantas started a third route to London via Tahiti, Mexico, and the Caribbean, called the Fiesta Route. Qantas dropped its Southern Cross Route and Fiesta Route in 1975. By 1969, Qantas had 11 Kangaroo Route flights a week from Sydney to London, taking 29–32 hours with 5–6 stops each; BOAC's 7-9 weekly flights previously had 7 stops.

In 1971 Qantas added Boeing 747s, reducing the travel time and number of stops (in the late 1970s flights typically stopped at Singapore and Bahrain). Fares fell, opening air travel to more people with more competition.

One-stop flights (1974–2018) 

In April 1974 Qantas commenced operating a one stop service from Perth to London with only one stop in Bombay with Boeing 707s.

In 1989 Qantas set a world distance record for commercial jets when a Boeing 747-400, the City of Canberra (VH-OJA), flew non-stop from London to Sydney in just over 20 hours (with special fuel and without passengers or cargo). This was the only nonstop flight ever made between both cities for the next 3 decades.

As part of a new arrangement with Emirates, from 2013 all Qantas through services to the United Kingdom stopped in Dubai rather than their traditional Singapore stop, and said their "Asian services were no longer be a subsidiary of the 'Kangaroo Route'". A hub in the middle of a route is more effective than a hub at either end as connecting traffic more easily fills the plane. 
Qantas also announced that its service to Frankfurt via Singapore would end in April 2013, leaving London as its only European destination.

After years of low demand and less popularity on Dubai services, Qantas announced in August 2017 that the Sydney-Dubai-London A380 Service will revert to a Sydney-Singapore-London service due to strong demand in the Asian market. Qantas flights on the traditional Kangaroo Route from Sydney to London reverted to a stopover in Singapore instead of Dubai on 25 March 2018. Five years after the change to fly through Dubai, Qantas uses the Airbus A380 on its new flagship route QF1/2, between Sydney and London via Singapore.

Non-stop flights (2018– )

Non-stop flights from Perth to London commenced in March 2018 with Boeing 787s, with the Kangaroo route becoming a non-stop route for the first time, while also connecting Australia and Europe via a non-stop route for the first time. (However, travel time from Sydney, Brisbane or Melbourne is slightly longer than via Singapore, Doha, Abu Dhabi or Dubai; for example, Sydney to London via Perth takes 26 hours, Sydney to London via Doha takes 22 hours). These flights operate out of Perth's Terminal 3 rather than the traditional T1 in order to facilitate seamless transfers from Qantas domestic flights. The non-stop service forms part of Qantas' secondary Kangaroo route QF9/10, between Melbourne and London via Perth. The route also opens up the possibility of further direct flights to Europe from Perth such as Paris and Frankfurt. In June 2022, Qantas launched a non-stop seasonal service from Perth to Rome.

In late March 2020, prior to Qantas cutting all international services due to the COVID-19 pandemic, several repatriation flights were operated by Airbus A380, routed as Sydney-Darwin-London. The Singaporean government had banned transit passengers and airspace in the Middle East was closed, due to the pandemic. This was the first time an Airbus A380 flew nonstop between Europe and Oceania.

In November 2021, Qantas resumed non-stop Kangaroo Route flights, this time from Darwin to London before resuming the non-stop route between Perth and London in May 2022 following the reopening of Western Australia for international travel.

Qantas' evolution of the Kangaroo Route 
Since its founding in 1935, Qantas has evolved the Kangaroo Route over time in terms of "hops" (routings), duration, and aircraft used.  Illustrated in the below table are snapshots of that ongoing evolution over the years.

Note:

Other Australia-United Kingdom flight operators
While The "Kangaroo Route"™ is a trademarked term belonging to Qantas, it is often re-appropriated by the media, other operators, and even Qantas themselves to refer to all flights between Australia and the United Kingdom.

Between 2003 and 2004, around 20 additional other airlines operated services between Australia and the United Kingdom including Air China, Air India, All Nippon Airways, Asiana Airlines, British Airways, Cathay Pacific, China Airlines, China Eastern Airlines, China Southern Airlines, Emirates, Etihad Airways, EVA Air, Garuda Indonesia, Japan Airlines, Korean Air, Malaysia Airlines, Qatar Airways, Philippine Airlines, Singapore Airlines, Thai Airways and Vietnam Airlines.

Aside from codeshares and alliances/partners, today there are over 20 airlines operating flights from Australia to the United Kingdom, including:

Project Sunrise
On 25 August 2017, Qantas announced Project Sunrise, aiming to fly non-stop from the East Coast of Australia (Sydney, Melbourne, and Brisbane) to London, Paris, Cape Town, Rio de Janeiro and New York City by 2022, and challenged Boeing and Airbus to create aircraft that can travel to such places without stopping. In 2019, Qantas issued a request for proposal for an aircraft with over 300 seats in four classes, to be delivered from 2022.
Both Boeing and Airbus submitted proposals in 2019. Boeing announced some delays in the B777-8 project in August 2019 after Etihad Airways dropped orders made in 2013, but the company made it clear that it remained in contention for Project Sunrise.

On 18–20 October 2019, Qantas made a 19-hour test flight QF7879 with a Boeing 787-9 from New York to Sydney. The next month, Qantas operated its first 19-20 hour test flight from London to Sydney. In commemoration of the London to Sydney flight, passengers were given replicas of the certificate rewarded to pilots Capt. Ross Smith, Lt. Keith Smith, Sgts. Wally Sheirs and Jim Bennett for successfully arriving in Australia from Great Britain in less than 30 days, after the Australian government challenged the world's leading aviators to do so in 1919, 100 years earlier. Two months later, on 13 December 2019, Qantas announced that their preferred aircraft for the project was the Airbus A350-1000. The aircraft will have an additional fuel tank and slightly increased MTOW to deliver the performance required on the Project Sunrise routes. No orders had been placed but Qantas were working with Airbus to order up to 12 aircraft, with the final decision expected within 2020.

On 5 May 2020, Qantas Group CEO Alan Joyce announced that Project Sunrise would be put on hold due to the impact of COVID-19 on global travel.
During a webcast on 6 June 2020 discussing the tourism industry, Joyce commented "I think the business case for doing it is very strong [...] When we are comfortable in doing it and have the financial strength to do it, we will be doing it."
Qantas would review its project at the end of 2021, towards a 2024 start of the 21-hour flights, meaning a delay of one year.

On 2 May 2022, Qantas placed a formal order for 12 Airbus A350-1000 aircraft for Project Sunrise flights to start between Sydney and London in 2025. The 238 seats will be split into 6 first class suites (three-abreast), 52 business class suites (four-abreast), 40 premium economy seats at 40″ pitch (eight-abreast) and 140 economy class seats at 33″ pitch (nine-abreast).

In literature

The book Beyond the Blue Horizon by travel correspondent Alexander Frater documents the author's attempt to fly all the sectors on the original 1935 Imperial/Qantas London-Brisbane route in 1984.

See also
Southern Cross Route – the Kangaroo Route's counterpart travelling via the Western Hemisphere
Wallaby Route - Qantas' route launched in 1952 connecting Sydney to Johannesburg, South Africa by many "little hops" via Melbourne, Perth, The Cocos Islands, and Mauritius.
Fiesta Route - Qantas' route that existed from 1964-1975 connecting Sydney to London via Fiji, Tahiti, Acapulco, Mexico City, The Bahamas, and Bermuda.

References

Airline routes
Aviation in Australia
Qantas